Alamgarh is a town and union council of Gujrat District, in the Punjab province of Pakistan.

See also
Thimka

References

Populated places in Gujrat District

Towns in Gujrat District